Mengyin County is a county in the southwest-central part of Shandong province, People's Republic of China. It is under the administration of Linyi City.

Administrative divisions
As 2012, this county is divided to one subdistrict, eight towns and two townships.
Subdistricts
Mengyin Subdistrict

Towns

Townships
Liancheng Township
Jiuzhai Township

Climate

References

External links 
 Official homepage

 
Counties of Shandong
Linyi